An Open Heart is a 2012 French drama film directed by Marion Laine.

Cast 
 Juliette Binoche as Mila
 Édgar Ramírez as Javier 
 Hippolyte Girardot as Marc
  as Christelle
 Aurélia Petit as Sylvie
 Bernard Verley as Masson

References

External links

External links

2012 drama films
2012 films
2010s French-language films
French drama films
2010s French films